The 2018 Arnold Palmer Cup was a team golf competition held from  6–8 July 2018 at Evian Resort Golf Club, Évian-les-Bains, France. It was the 22nd time the event had been contested and the first under a new format in which women golfers played in addition to men and an international team, representing the rest of the world, replaced the European team. The United States won the match 38½–21½.

Format
The contest was played over three days. On Friday, there were 12 mixed four-ball matches. On Saturday there were 12 mixed foursomes matches in the morning and 12 fourball matches in the afternoon, six all-women matches and six all-men matches. 24 singles matches were played on Sunday. In all, 60 matches were played.

Each of the 60 matches was worth one point in the larger team competition. If a match was all square after the 18th hole, each side earned half a point toward their team total. The team that accumulated at least 30½ points won the competition.

Teams

Friday's mixed fourball matches

Saturday's matches

Morning mixed foursomes matches

Afternoon fourball matches

Sunday's singles matches

Dewi Weber conceded her singles match because of illness.

Michael Carter award
The Michael Carter Award winners were Olivia Mehaffey and Collin Morikawa.

References

External links
Arnold Palmer Cup official site

Arnold Palmer Cup
Golf tournaments in France
Arnold Palmer Cup
Arnold Palmer Cup
Arnold Palmer Cup